Where Do I Begin may refer to :

Songs
"Where Do I Begin" (The Chemical Brothers song), 1997 song
"Where Do I Begin", a song on the Sneaky Sound System album 2
"(Where Do I Begin?) Love Story", first introduced as instrumental theme in the 1970 film Love Story